Universal Music India Pvt. Ltd. (UMI) was launched in 1999; it is a part of the Universal Music Group, an American-based, Dutch-listed multinational music corporation. Universal Music India is registered with the Indian Music Industry, a trust that represents the recording industry distributors in India. UMI appointed Devraj Sanyal as its managing director in 2011, succeeding Rajat Kakar, managing director of Universal Music India for the previous eight years.

Universal Music India brings the news, album updates, tour updates, trivia, of artists worldwide for their fans. The 'Whats Hot Now' list includes a number of artists from the Universal Music Group (currently including Eminem, Rihanna, Taylor Swift, Lady Gaga, Katy Perry, Enrique Iglesias, Avicii, Justin Bieber, Lorde and many more) and their details, album launches, tour dates etc.

Notable artists

 A. R. Rahman
 Anaida
 Arijit Singh
 Abhijeet Sawant
 Adnan Sami
 Alka Yagnik
 Ali Zafar
 Atif Aslam
 Amit Kumar
 Anindita Paul
 Anmoll Mallik
 Anup Jalota
 Asha Bhosle
 Asim Azhar
 Babul Supriyo
 Badshah
 Bally Sagoo
 Bhitali Das
 Bhupen Hazarika
 Bombay Rockers
 Bhupinder Singh
 Bohemia
 Boomarang
 Coshish
 Divine
 Euphoria
 Falguni Pathak
 Farhan Saeed
 Faakhir Mehmood
 Ghulam Ali
 Girish and The Chronicles
 Haroon
 Ikka Singh
 Indus Creed
 Jagjit Singh
 Jal The Band
 Jaz Dhami
 K.S. Chithra
 Kavita Krishnamurthy
 Kavita Seth
 Kishore Kumar
 KR$NA
 Kumar Sanu
 Lata Mangeshkar
 Lesle Lewis
 Lost Stories
 Lucky Ali
 Mehnaz Hoosein
 Mohammed Rafi
 Nahid Afrin
 Nishtha Sharma
 Pandit Hariprasad Chaurasia
 Pandit Ram Narayan
 Pandit Ravi Shankar
 Pandit Shivkumar Sharma
 Pankaj Udhas
 Papon
 Parthiv Gohil
 Poorvi Koutish
 Rabbi Shergill
 Rahat Fateh Ali Khan
 Raja Kumari
 Sagarika
 Samved
 Shaan
 Shreya Ghoshal
 Sonu Nigam
 Tarali Sarma
 Udit Narayan
 Ustad Amjad Ali Khan
 Ustad Zakir Hussain
 Vipul Mehta
 Yasser Desai
 Yo Yo Honey Singh
 Zubeen Garg
 Zoe Viccaji

Discography

Location
Its head office in Bandra East, Mumbai, oversees the company's interests in Bangladesh, Sri Lanka and Pakistan, in addition to India.

See also

 List of record labels
 List of Universal Music Group artists

References

External links
 
 UMG Corporate Page

Universal Music Group
Record label distributors